= Geometric process =

In probability, statistics and related fields, the geometric process is a counting process, introduced by Lam in 1988. It is defined as

The geometric process. Given a sequence of non-negative random variables :$\{X_k,k=1,2, \dots\}$, if they are independent and the cdf of $X_k$ is given by $F(a^{k-1}x)$ for $k=1,2, \dots$, where $a$ is a positive constant, then $\{X_k,k=1,2,\ldots\}$ is called a geometric process (GP).

The GP has been widely applied in reliability engineering

Below are some of its extensions.

- The α- series process. Given a sequence of non-negative random variables:$\{X_k,k=1,2, \dots\}$, if they are independent and the cdf of $\frac{X_k}{k^a}$ is given by $F(x)$ for $k=1,2, \dots$, where $a$ is a positive constant, then $\{X_k,k=1,2,\ldots\}$ is called an α- series process.
- The threshold geometric process. A stochastic process $\{Z_n, n = 1,2, \ldots\}$ is said to be a threshold geometric process (threshold GP), if there exists real numbers $a_i > 0, i = 1,2, \ldots , k$ and integers $\{1 = M_1 < M_2 < \cdots < M_k < M_{k+1} = \infty\}$ such that for each $i = 1, \ldots , k$, $\{a_i^{n-M_i}Z_n, M_i \le n < M_{i+1}\}$ forms a renewal process.
- The doubly geometric process. Given a sequence of non-negative random variables :$\{X_k,k=1,2, \dots\}$, if they are independent and the cdf of $X_k$ is given by $F(a^{k-1}x^{h(k)})$ for $k=1,2, \dots$, where $a$ is a positive constant and $h(k)$ is a function of $k$ and the parameters in $h(k)$ are estimable, and $h(k)>0$ for natural number $k$, then $\{X_k,k=1,2,\ldots\}$ is called a doubly geometric process (DGP).
- The semi-geometric process. Given a sequence of non-negative random variables $\{X_k, k=1,2,\dots\}$, if $P\{X_k < x|X_{k-1}=x_{k-1}, \dots , X_1=x_1\} = P\{X_k < x|X_{k-1}=x_{k-1}\}$ and the marginal distribution of $X_k$ is given by $P\{X_k < x\}=F_k (x)(\equiv F(a^{k-1} x))$, where $a$ is a positive constant, then $\{X_k, k=1,2,\dots\}$ is called a semi-geometric process
- The double ratio geometric process. Given a sequence of non-negative random variables $\{Z_k^D,k=1,2, \dots\}$, if they are independent and the cdf of $Z_k^D$ is given by $F_k^D(t)=1-\exp\{-\int_0^{t} b_k h(a_k u) du\}$ for $k=1,2, \dots$, where $a_k$ and $b_k$ are positive parameters (or ratios) and $a_1=b_1=1$. We call the stochastic process the double-ratio geometric process (DRGP).
